Terence "Terry" Moore (born June 2, 1958 in Moncton, New Brunswick) is a former Canadian national soccer team, NASL, and Irish League player.

A steady central defender, Moore lived the first five years of his life in Moncton until his family moved to Northern Ireland. He grew up there and played in the Irish League for Larne and the famous Belfast club Glentoran. Moore made his international debut for Canada against Scotland in 1983, and played in all four games when the Olympic team reached the quarterfinals in 1984. He was a member of the 1986 FIFA World Cup squad in Mexico in 1986, but did not play in the finals.

Moore played 118 regular season games in the NASL and 16 in the playoffs from 1980 to 1984 for three teams. He was a member of the Tulsa Roughnecks team that won the 1983 Soccer Bowl in Vancouver over Toronto Blizzard. With the NASL defunct, Moore returned to Northern Ireland to play and live. At the time of the 1986 World Cup, he was playing for Glentoran. In 2005, he was inducted into the Canadian Soccer Hall of Fame.

External links
 / Canada Soccer Hall of Fame
NASL stats

1958 births
Living people
1986 FIFA World Cup players
Association football defenders
Canadian expatriate sportspeople in the United States
Canadian expatriate soccer players
Canada men's international soccer players
Canada Soccer Hall of Fame inductees
Canadian soccer players
CONCACAF Championship-winning players
Expatriate soccer players in the United States
Footballers at the 1984 Summer Olympics
Glentoran F.C. players
Larne F.C. players
North American Soccer League (1968–1984) indoor players
North American Soccer League (1968–1984) players
Olympic soccer players of Canada
San Diego Sockers (NASL) players
Sportspeople from Moncton
Tampa Bay Rowdies (1975–1993) players
Tulsa Roughnecks (1978–1984) players